The General Union of Loom Overlookers (GULO) was a trade union representing junior supervisors in textile manufacturing in the United Kingdom.  While most members were based in Lancashire, it also had members in Yorkshire, East Anglia and Essex.

History
In 1875, a National Confederate Association of Power Loom Overlookers was established as a loose organisation of sixteen local trade unions, most based in Lancashire.  As all its affiliates were very small, its total membership was around 1,000.  In 1885, it organised a conference with the larger Blackburn and Pendleton unions, which saw themselves as friendly societies and had refused to join the confederation.  The conference was successful, and the General Union of Associations of Power-Loom Overlookers was established.  It took part in a large number of local strikes in its early years.

Affiliates included:

The union was keen to support broader trade union ventures.  It was a founder member of the Labour Representation Committee, and affiliated to the United Textile Factory Workers' Association, the General Federation of Trade Unions and the Trades Union Congress.  It was also a founder member of the Northern Counties Textile Trades Federation.

Early in the 1900s, the association changed its name to become the General Union of Associations of Loom Overlookers.  Membership continued to grow until 1933, when it peaked at 8,820.  It remained steady at around 5,000 until 1960, at which point 25 unions were affiliated.  However, membership then began to fall, in line with the decline in the British cotton industry.  In response, in 1971, the union founded the "British Federation of Textile Technicians" with two smaller, independent unions: the Yorkshire Association of Power Loom Overlookers and the Scottish Union of Power Loom Overlookers.

By 1979, the union consisted of fourteen local unions, although their total membership was only 2,410.  It suffered a dramatic loss of membership as mills closed during the 1980s and 1990s, with only 265 members remaining at the end of the century.  By 1997, it had only two affiliates, the United Association of Power Loom Overlookers and the Amalgamated Power Loom Overlookers, and that year its federal structure was abandoned, members instead joining the central body, now renamed the "General Union of Loom Overlookers".  Despite this change, membership continued to drop, falling to only 138 in 2007, when the union was dissolved.  Former members of the union transferred to the GMB.

General Secretaries
1885: John Sidebotham
1905: James E. Tattersall
1913: James E. Tattersall and Edward Duxbury
1921: Edward Duxbury
1935: Jeremiah Proctor
1949: Fred Titherington
1963: Arthur Howcroft
1976: Harold Brown
1982: R. Richardson
1986: Eddie Macro
1990: Don Rishton

References

Defunct trade unions of the United Kingdom
1885 establishments in the United Kingdom
Cotton industry trade unions
Trade unions established in 1885
Trade unions disestablished in 2007
GMB (trade union) amalgamations
Trade unions based in Lancashire